On October 8, 1816, a special election was held in , the second special election in that district in the 14th Congress.  The reason for the special election was Thomas Burnside (DR)'s resignation to accept a judicial appointment in April of that year.  Burnside himself had been elected to the seat in the previous special election.

Election results

Maclay took his seat December 3, 1816, at the start of the 2nd session of the 14th Congress

See also
List of special elections to the United States House of Representatives

References

Pennsylvania 1816 09
Pennsylvania 1816 09
1816 09
Pennsylvania 09
United States House of Representatives 09
United States House of Representatives 1816 09